Seapoint railway station serves the locality of Seapoint, between Blackrock and Salthill in Dún Laoghaire–Rathdown, Ireland.

History
The station opened on 1 July 1862 and was originally called Monkstown & Seapoint, though the following year this was changed to just Seapoint. It was electrified in 1984 with the arrival of DART services.

The ticket office is open between 05:45-00:50 AM, Monday to Friday.

Transport services 
There is no direct public transport to or from the station. The nearest bus stops are on Monkstown Road, located 450 m from the station, which are served by the following:

Dublin Bus Routes:

 7 / 7A from Mountjoy Square to Bride's Glen / Loughlinstown. Route 7 provides a connection to the Luas Green Line terminus at Bride's Glen
 7N Nitelink from Dublin city centre to Shankill, via Blackrock (Friday & Saturday only)

See also
 List of railway stations in Ireland

References

External links
Irish Rail Seapoint Station Website

Iarnród Éireann stations in Dún Laoghaire–Rathdown
1862 establishments in Ireland
Railway stations opened in 1862
Railway stations in the Republic of Ireland opened in the 19th century